Maika Monroe (born Dillon Monroe Buckley; May 29, 1993) is an American actress and professional kiteboarder. She had her breakthrough headlining the horror film It Follows (2014), which won her several accolades—including an Empire Award nomination. She is recognized for her work in the horror genre, particularly for starring in the thriller The Guest (2014), the sci-fi thriller Tau (2018), and the psychological thrillers Greta (2018) and Watcher (2022).

Monroe made her film acting debut with the drama film At Any Price (2012). Aside from her work in horror, she has also had roles in the drama film Labor Day (2013), the action film Independence Day: Resurgence (2016), the neo-noir coming-of-age film Hot Summer Nights (2017), the comedy-drama film After Everything (2018) and the black comedy film Villains (2019).

Early life 
Monroe was born Dillon Monroe Buckley on May 29, 1993, in Santa Barbara, California, the daughter of sign language interpreter Dixie and construction worker Jack Buckley. She later changed her first name to Maika, by which she had already been known for most of her life. At the age of 17, Monroe left Santa Barbara and moved to Cabarete in the Dominican Republic to continue training in kiteboarding after spending the previous summer there. She subsequently completed her senior year of high school online.

Career

In April 2012, Monroe signed up for the drama film Labor Day, an adaptation of the novel of the same name. She played Mandy, a farm girl who romances with a young man and eventually becomes his wife and the mother of his child. In June 2013, she joined the cast of the psychological thriller film The Guest. In 2014, she starred as Jay in the horror film It Follows, which became a cult hit. In 2016, she co-starred in the invasion thriller film The 5th Wave, based on the novel of the same name. Monroe also co-starred in the 2016 movie Independence Day: Resurgence, the sequel to Independence Day (1996), playing former First Daughter Patricia Whitmore.

Filmography

Film

Television

Awards and nominations

References

External links 

 

1993 births
Living people
American film actresses
American television actresses
21st-century American actresses
Actresses from Santa Barbara, California
American kitesurfers
Sportspeople from Santa Barbara, California
Female kitesurfers
American sportswomen